First Independent Films was a British film distributor and home video company that replaced Vestron Video International's UK operations. HTV, the ITV franchise holder for Wales and the West of England, acquired Vestron UK in May 1990 and renamed the company to First Independent Films.

Although a small film company, the company distributed a wide selection of genres, but they mainly served as a distributor for New Line Cinema, Turner Pictures Worldwide Distribution and Hanna-Barbera until they were sold to Warner Bros. in 1996. The company also distributed independent films.

Some films released by First Independent Films were distributed and marketed by Cinema Club, a home video company that specialises in movies owned by Video Collection International (now 2 Entertain).

Following the commercial failure of G.I. Jane in the UK, First Independent Films' owners (United News & Media, by this point the parent company of HTV) put the company up for sale. First Independent Films was sold to Columbia TriStar Home Video (now Sony Pictures Home Entertainment) and the label was folded into Columbia TriStar in 1999. However, Columbia TriStar continued to use the First Independent Films label for some years afterwards.

Film releases
Films distributed theatrically by First Independent Films include:

1991:
 Catchfire
 Eminent Domain
 Fear
 Misery
 Over Her Dead Body
 Sibling Rivalry
 Prayer of the Rollerboys
 Dolly Dearest
 Let Him Have It
 City Slickers
 Homicide
 Iron Maze

1992:
 Year of the Gun
 Late for Dinner
 Naked Lunch
 Ricochet
 Don't Tell Mom the Babysitter's Dead
 The Lawnmower Man
 House Party 2

1993:
 Deep Cover
 Night and the City
 Folks!
 Honeymoon in Vegas
 Mr. Saturday Night
 Wild West
 Bad Behaviour
 Frauds
 Tom and Jerry: The Movie
 Menace II Society
 Warlock: The Armageddon
 Raining Stones
 Naked
 Sins of Desire

1994:
 Bhaji on the Beach
 A Dangerous Woman
 Sleep with Me
 Above the Rim

1995:
 Nostradamus
 Dumb and Dumber
 Bulletproof Heart
 Mortal Kombat
 The Basketball Diaries

1996:
 Lawnmower Man 2: Beyond Cyberspace
 White Squall
 Now and Then
 Rainbow
 Original Gangstas
 Boston Kickout
 Crimetime
 The Last of the High Kings

1997:
 Normal Life
 Eddie
 Killer: A Journal of Murder
 Trigger Happy
 Night Falls on Manhattan
 House of America
 G.I. Jane
 Keep the Aspidistra Flying
 The Myth of Fingerprints
 This World, Then the Fireworks

1998
 Traveller
 Wishmaster
 Savior

1999:
 Orgazmo
 Just the Ticket
 A Walk on the Moon

References 

Film distributors of the United Kingdom
Home video distributors
Video production companies
Mass media companies established in 1991
Mass media companies disestablished in 1999
Film organisations in the United Kingdom
1991 establishments in the United Kingdom
Sony Pictures Entertainment Motion Picture Group
Sony Pictures Entertainment